The Man from the West is a 1926 American silent Western film directed by Albert S. Rogell and starring Art Acord, Eugenia Gilbert and Ervin Renard.

Cast
 Art Acord as Art Louden 
 Eugenia Gilbert as Iris Millard 
 Ervin Renard as Carter Blake 
 William Welsh as Bill Hayes 
 Vin Moore as Lloyd Millard 
 Dick Gilbert as Hanna 
 George Grandee as Ranch Guest 
 Eunice Murdock Moore as Iris's Aunt

References

External links
 

1926 films
1926 Western (genre) films
1920s English-language films
Universal Pictures films
Films directed by Albert S. Rogell
American black-and-white films
Silent American Western (genre) films
1920s American films